Shree Kshetra Korthan Khandoba Devasthan is a temple situated at the height of 951 meters on the hills of Pimpalgaon Rotha, which is located 50 km from the city of Ahmednagar and 30 km from the city of Parner.

History
In 1491 the old temple was built but in 1997 the temple was redeveloped by villagers. With the Bramhlin Param Pujya Shree Gagangiri Maharaj the Suvarna kalash is placed on Champashasti. Thus Champashasti has been celebrated as a festival since 1997. Programs of Satsangs used to be arranged on that day. Nearly 15 laks people visit the temple every year. One can see part of District Ahmednagar, and Pune can be seen from temple. Roads from these two districts come here. Under Pradhanmantri Gramsadak Yojna street-lights, toilets, Sambhamandap and Dharmashala are being built. The movie named Korthancha Khanderaya was produced here, which also helped to make Devasthan popular. The temple has its own Audio & Video cassettes too. The government of Maharashtra awarded the temple into group "B" ("B" group temple foundation gave Khandoba Devasthan 70 laks for doing work on temple), so more facilities and management may be possible.

About Devasthan
From ancient times Lord Khandoba has been worshiped in Maharashtra, Karnataka, Madhya Pradesh, Gujarat and Goa of India. His deity is a form of Lord Shiva.

On Hindu month Margashish and the day of "Shukla 6", Champashasti is celebrated as "Shree Khandoba Avtaar Diwas". On Paush poornima Shree Khandoba wed with Mhalsabai; thus we celebrate grand Yatra Mohotsav. On this day many people from Maharashtra as well as Madhya Pradesh, Gujarat, Karnataka, and Goa come. The statue of Khandoba is thought to not have been made by anyone, but rather is self-generated; thus it is called Kor than, here. Kor means "untouched".

Yatra
This temple has a grand yatra of the god Khandoba every year on the Hindu month of Paush and the day of the poornima.
This grand celebration lasts three days. The second day of yatra has a very popular bullock cart race locally called the Gaade. This racing generally consists of a pair of bullocks with Bhandara on their whole body. Sometimes the bullocks are led by a horse and a man sitting on it. A specially dedicated track is made for this event on the right side of the temple. Then, the second new track is made at Bhandara Doongar (hill), but in 2011 this race was carried out at the far left of the temple.

The third day of the yatra is called Kathya. Kathya generally stands for the long wooden stick (nearly 35–50 feet), covered by various colored cloths, which is roped to give support. The first kadthi to arrive at the temple is of Brahmanwada kathi it is called as "Manachi Kathi". The other villages kathya (from Belhe and Aale) follows it. When this kathya touches the top of temple (Kalash), the yatra of the God Khandoba is declared finished.

References 

Hindu temples in Maharashtra